Mircea Vasile Rus (born 9 April 1978) is a Romanian former football player who played as a right-back.

External links
 

1978 births
Living people
People from Câmpia Turzii
Romanian footballers
Association football defenders
Liga I players
Liga II players
FC Universitatea Cluj players
FC Politehnica Timișoara players
ACF Gloria Bistrița players
CSM Unirea Alba Iulia players
CSM Câmpia Turzii players